The economic impact of the 2022 Russian invasion of Ukraine began in late February 2022, in the days after Russia recognized two breakaway Ukrainian republics and launched an invasion of Ukraine. The subsequent economic sanctions have targeted large parts of the Russian economy, Russian oligarchs, and members of the Russian government. Russia has responded with sanctions of its own. Both the conflict and the sanctions have had a strongly negative impact on the world economic recovery during the COVID-19 recession. As a result of its war, estimates of a 30-year economic setback are projected for Russia. A wave of protests and strikes have occurred across Europe against the rise of bills and living expenses.

The war in Ukraine has also resulted in significant loss of human capital, destruction of agricultural trading infrastructure, huge damages to productive capacity, including through the loss of electricity, and a reduction in private consumption of more than a third relative to pre-war levels.

Background

Beginning in 2014, Russia has been facing sanctions over its annexation of Crimea which have stunted the nation's economic growth. In 2020, the COVID-19 recession and the oil price war with Saudi Arabia also affected the Russian economy. Additional sanctions occurred in the lead-up to the invasion in 2021. The Russian stock market declined by twenty percent during the military buildup.

History of economic impact 

Kristalina Georgieva, the managing director of the International Monetary Fund (IMF), warned that the conflict posed a substantial economic risk for the region and internationally. She added that the IMF could help other countries impacted by the conflict, complementary to a $2.2 billion loan package being prepared to assist Ukraine. David Malpass, the president of the World Bank Group, said that the conflict would have far-reaching economic and social effects, and reported that the bank was preparing options for significant economic and fiscal support to Ukrainians and the region.

Despite unprecedented international sanctions against Russia, payments for energy and raw materials were largely spared from these measures, as were food supplies because of the potential impact on world food prices. Russia and Ukraine are major producers of wheat that is exported through the Bosporus to Mediterranean and North African countries. The expulsion of some Russian banks from SWIFT is expected to affect the country's exports. Since Russia is the largest trading and economic partner for post-Soviet states in Central Asia and a major destination for millions of CIS's migrant workers, Central Asia has been particularly hard hit by sanctions against Russia.

Sanctions also included asset freezes on the Russian Central Bank, which holds $630 billion in foreign-exchange reserves, to prevent it from offsetting the impact of sanctions. On 5 May, President of the European Council Charles Michel said: "I am absolutely convinced that this is extremely important not only to freeze assets but also to make possible to confiscate it, to make it available for the rebuilding of Ukraine".

Russia 

Economic sanctions affected Russia from the first day of the invasion, with the stock market falling by up to 39% (RTS Index). The rouble fell to record lows, as Russians rushed to exchange currency. Stock exchanges in Moscow and St. Petersburg were suspended until at least 18 March, making it the longest closure in Russia's history. On 26 February, S&P Global Ratings downgraded the Russian government credit rating to "junk", causing funds that require investment-grade bonds to dump Russian debt, making further borrowing very difficult for Russia.

The Central Bank of Russia announced interventions, its first since the 2014 annexation of Crimea, to stabilise the market. On 28 February, it raised interest rates to 20% and banned foreigners from selling local securities. According to a former deputy chairman of the Russian central bank, the sanctions put the Russian National Wealth Fund at risk of disappearing. With the value of the Russian rouble and the share prices for Russian equities falling on major exchanges, the Moscow Exchange was closed for a day, which was afterwards extended to over a week. As of 28 February, the price of Russia's credit default swaps signalled about a 56% chance of default. Fitch Ratings feared that Russia would imminently default on its debts.

On 27 February, BP, one of the world's seven largest oil and gas companies and the single largest foreign investor in Russia, announced it was divesting from Rosneft. The Rosneft interest comprised about half of BP's oil and gas reserves and a third of its production. The divestment was projected to cost the company up to $25 billion, and analysts noted that it was unlikely that BP would be able to recover anywhere near the value of Rosneft. The same day, the Government Pension Fund of Norway, the world's largest sovereign wealth fund, announced that it would divest itself from its Russian assets. The fund owned about 25 billion Norwegian krone ($2.83 billion) in Russian company shares and government bonds.

On 28 February, Shell also announced that it would be pulling its investments in Russia. On 1 March, the Italian energy company Eni announced that it would cancel its investments into the Blue Stream pipeline. The same day, the world's largest shipping companies, Maersk and Mediterranean Shipping Company, suspended all container shipments to Russia, excluding foodstuffs, medical, and humanitarian supplies.

Russia is reportedly experiencing brain drain due to mass emigration of more than 300,000 mainly younger Russians, many of whom are tech industry professionals, to countries like Armenia, Georgia, and Turkey. More than 50,000 Russian information technology specialists have left Russia. In response to sanctions in the entertainment industry, Russia is considering the legalisation of software piracy.

Cyberattacks by unidentified global hackers have also been a problem for Russia. For example, a hacking of the Russian Federal Air Transport Agency, Rosaviatsia, in late March 2022 resulted in massive disruption and the agency switching back to the use of paper document flow and postal mail. Due to budget limitations, Rosaviatsia did not have the necessary backups of the hacked data.

On 11 April, Russian Railways defaulted on 268 million dollars of bonds after failing to make payments on a Swiss franc bond.

In late July 2022, the IMF upgraded Russia's GDP estimate by 2.5%, but some economists see a long-term problem for the Russian economy, and explain its resilience only by a short-term increase of energy prices. Russia was able to leverage its economic power by cutting gas supplies to Europe, and play up its agricultural might as the largest wheat exporter globally. By August 2022, Russia was selling almost as much oil as before its invasion of Ukraine. Sales to the Middle East and Asia helped make up for declining exports to Europe, and due to the higher price, Moscow revenues were $20 billion monthly compared to $14.6 billion a year before (2021).

Despite international sanctions during the Russo-Ukrainian War, Russian energy sales have increased in value, and its exports have expanded with new financing options and payment methods for international buyers. At the same time, the Russian budget had a record deficit of 1.45 trillion roubles by August, mostly due to collapse of tax income from fossil fuel exports from 70 billion down to 33.7 billion roubles per month, with total reduction of monthly budget incomes by 10%. In September, the Russian Ministry of Finance notified all public sectors of a reduction in spending by 10%.

Some estimates suggest that reconstruction of the war-torn annexed territories would cost Russia between $100 and $200 billion. The reconstruction of Mariupol alone will likely cost more than $14 billion. A state budget published on 29 September by the Kremlin revealed that 3.3 billion roubles (about $59 million USD) had been set aside to rebuild the regions.

In November 2022 it was reported that Russia had officially entered a recession as the Federal State Statistics Service had reported a national GDP loss for the second consecutive quarter.

According to most estimates, every day of the war in Ukraine costs Russia $500 million to $1 billion.

Ukraine 
The National Bank of Ukraine suspended currency markets, announcing that it would fix the official exchange rate. The central bank also limited cash withdrawals to ₴100,000 per day and prohibited withdrawal in foreign currencies by members of the general public. The PFTS Ukraine Stock Exchange stated on 24 February that trading was suspended due to the emergency events. On 10 April 2022, Bloomberg News service reported that the Ukrainian economic growth for 2022 is likely to suffer a sharp decline estimated at a 45% decrease in annual performance as a result of the Russian invasion.

Belarus 
The value of Belarusian dollar denominated bonds due in 2027 fell to a record low of 6.5 cents from 88 cents prior to the invasion.

Armenia 
The consequences of the conflict had both positive and negative effects on the economy of Armenia. One of the negative impacts of the war was that due to the influx of Russian migrants, the prices of the apartments in the centre of Yerevan increased sharply on average 109,000 AMD per square. If before the war people could rent an apartment in the centre of the capital (two-rooms and furnished to be more specific) for 500 Euros, in 2022 during the war the price has risen 50%.

Another negative effect of the Russian migrants who came to Armenia was the appreciation of AMD. According to Google Finance, the exchange rate of dollar to dram was less than 400 AMD (395.2915 AMD more precise). The problems with the appreciation of the dram is that when Russians came into Armenia, they fuelled the demand for dram and this, combined with the fact that the exchange rate of the USD decreased, the appreciation of the AMD made the products being exported to other countries less competitive.

The IT sphere was also impacted, the fact partly also connected with the appreciation of AMD. The number of Russian IT workers in Armenia increased, creating a competition amongst local IT workers and Russians. While that led to a higher supply of labour in the IT sphere, the competition created by it caused local Armenian IT workers to leave their jobs or to work as freelancers, which means that they may work for another non-Armenian company and pay less taxes to the Armenian Government.

During the Fall of 2022 Armenia also faced an aggression by the Azerbaijani armed forces. This event was similar to Ukraine's. The National Statistical Committee (NSC) issued official data that showed Armenia's GDP increased by 14.8% over the previous year during the third quarter. Economy Minister wrote "The economy has recovered quickly after the September shock". Information and communication sectors had the largest growth of 59.2% when compared to the same time in 2021; financial and insurance sectors expanded by 57.3%; and transportation and warehousing sectors rose by 41.3%. Wholesale and retail trade, auto and motorcycle repair (20%), building (19.9%), manufacturing (18%), administration and related sectors (16.2%), and lodging and catering (12.8%) also recorded high growth rates. The Armenian government forecasts their economy will grow by 7%, while inflation is projected at 4% (± 1.5%).

The World Bank's report released Sunday provides further details and numbers. In that report the World Bank revised its projection for Armenia's economic growth in 2022 from 5.3% to 1.2%, noting that "the impact of Russia's invasion of Ukraine on Armenia's economy is likely to be notably negative, but the scale remains undetermined." Sanctions and boycotts imposed by the European Union and the United States have harmed Armenia as Russia is a significant economic and investment partner for Armenia, accounting for around a third of recent exports and imports. Russian firms accounted for more than 40% of Armenia's "net foreign direct investment stock" in the previous year.
Remittances from Russia contribute for 5% of Armenia's GDP, and 40% of all tourists last year came from that country.

Further, Russia has a major influence over several of Armenia's important economic sectors, or even holds monopolies in some of them particularly in the areas of energy, minerals, and food. The World Bank report states that Russia is the source of all of Armenia's imports of wheat and gas. Remittances, trade, and investment are projected to suffer significantly in Armenia as a result of the Russian financial crisis and the ensuing collapse of the rouble. The price of food and other essentials has increased for Armenians due to global inflationary forces. With Armenia still battling to recover from the twin effects of a pandemic and a severe military defeat to Azerbaijan in 2020, the predicted economic damage from the conflict in Ukraine comes at a bad time for Armenia.

Armenia's economy shrank by a staggering 7.4% in 2020, in stark contrast to its 7.6% record growth in 2019. According to the World Bank's research, the country's economy only recovered by 5.7% on a year-over-year basis in the previous year, primarily due to private and public consumption. Shocks from the Ukraine conflict will cause the economy in the larger region of Europe and Central Asia to fall by more than 4% this year. By the end of the year, Russia’s economy is expected to shrink by over 11%, and Ukraine’s by over 45%, the bank predicts.

Commodities 

Russia is the world's largest exporter of grains, natural gas, and fertilisers, and among the world's largest suppliers of crude oil and metals, including palladium, platinum, gold, cobalt, nickel, and aluminium. The invasion threatened the energy supply from Russia to Europe, with natural gas prices in Europe reaching an all-time high of $3,700 per thousand cubic meters on 7 March at ICE Futures, and Brent oil prices rising above $130 a barrel for the first time since 2008. This caused European countries to seek to diversify their energy supply routes. On 7 March, German chancellor Olaf Scholz and other European leaders pushed back against the call by the US and Ukraine to ban imports of Russian gas and oil because "Europe's supply of energy for heat generation, mobility, power supply and industry cannot be secured in any other way". However, the EU indicated that it would cut its gas dependency on Russia by two-thirds in 2022.

At the time of the invasion, Ukraine was the fourth-largest exporter of corn and wheat, and the world's largest exporter of sunflower oil, with Russia and Ukraine together responsible for 29% of the world's wheat exports and 75% of world sunflower oil exports. On 25 February, the benchmark Chicago Board of Trade March wheat futures contracts reached their highest price since 2012, with the prices of corn and soybean also spiking. The head of the World Food Programme, David Beasley, warned in March that the war in Ukraine could take the global food crisis to "levels beyond anything we've seen before". A potential disruption to global wheat supplies could exacerbate the ongoing hunger crisis in Yemen, Afghanistan and East Africa.

The supply of neon, needed for chip manufacture and lasers, was also severely constrained by the conflict. Ukraine produces about 70% of the global neon supply, and 90% of the semiconductor-grade neon used in the United States. The two largest suppliers in Ukraine, which together account for half of global neon production, were shuttered after the conflict broke out. The supply of krypton and xenon, of which Ukraine is also a major exporter, was affected as well. On 31 March, in apparent retaliation against Western economic sanctions, Putin announced that Russia would stop supplying gas to Europe that was not paid for in roubles.

On 26 April, Gazprom announced that gas supplies to Poland and Bulgaria would halt.

In April 2022, Russia supplied 45% of EU's gas imports, earning $900 million a day. In the first two months after Russia invaded Ukraine, Russia earned $66.5 billion from fossil fuel exports, and the EU accounted for 71% of that trade. The European Commission and International Energy Agency presented joint plans to reduce reliance on Russian energy, reduce Russian gas imports by two thirds within a year, and completely by 2030.

In May 2022, the European Commission proposed and approved a partial ban on oil imports from Russia, part of the economic response to the Russian invasion of Ukraine. On 18 May 2022, the European Union published plans to end its reliance on Russian oil, natural gas and coal by 2027. In June 2022, the United States government agreed to allow Italian company Eni and Spanish company Repsol to import oil from Venezuela to Europe to replace oil imports from Russia. France negotiated with the United Arab Emirates to replace some Russian oil imports.

In June 2022, the European Union, Egypt and Israel signed a natural gas agreement becoming part of a trilateral deal. The memorandum of understanding was announced by European commission president Ursula von der Leyen. However, the deal faced a few roadblocks like Green's Mounir Satouri, the European parliament’s lead MEP on Egypt threw light on EU’s relations with the latter in a letter written to von der Leyen, highlighting its dismal human rights record.

As part of the sanctions imposed on Russia, on 2 September 2022, the finance ministers of the G7 group agreed to cap the price of Russian oil and petroleum products in an effort intended to reduce Russia's ability to finance its war on Ukraine.

Impact on markets and economies
The 2022 attacks and the subsequent economic sanctions had a severe impact on the Russian and Ukrainian economies, and decreased supply to some worldwide markets.

Cost of food and crops 

Wheat prices surged to their highest prices since 2008 in response to the 2022 attacks. Ukraine accounted for 10% of global wheat exports. At the time of the invasion, Ukraine was the fourth-largest exporter of corn and wheat, and the world's largest exporter of sunflower oil, with Russia and Ukraine together responsible for 27% of the world's wheat exports and 53% of the world's sunflowers and seeds. The head of the World Food Programme, David Beasley, warned in March that the war in Ukraine could take the global food crisis to "levels beyond anything we've seen before".

A potential disruption to global wheat supplies could exacerbate the ongoing hunger crisis in Yemen, Afghanistan and East Africa. The American Bakers Association president warned that the price of anything made with grain would begin rising as all the grain markets are interrelated. The chief agricultural economist for Wells Fargo stated that Ukraine will likely be severely limited in their ability to plant crops in spring 2022 and lose an agricultural year, while an embargo on Russian crops would create more inflation of food prices. Recovering crop production capabilities may take years even after fighting has stopped.

Surging wheat prices resulting from the conflict have strained African countries such as Egypt, which are highly dependent upon Russian and Ukrainian wheat exports, and have provoked fears of social unrest. At least 25 African countries import a third of their wheat from Russia and Ukraine, and 15 of them import more than half from those two countries. On 24 February, the Chinese government announced that it would drop all restrictions on Russian wheat as part of an agreement that had been reached earlier in February; the South China Morning Post called this a potential "lifeline" for the Russian economy.

On 4 March, the Food and Agriculture Organization (FAO) of the United Nations reported that the world Food Price Index reached an all-time high in February, posting a 24% year-over-year increase. Most of the data for the February report was compiled before the invasion, but analysts said a prolonged conflict could have a major impact on grain exports.

On 30 March, at a United Nations meeting, the United States Deputy Secretary of State Wendy Sherman stated that the 2022 Russian invasion of Ukraine, including the naval blockade of Ukraine's sea ports and armed attacks on civilian cargo ships, created a critical food shortage in Ukraine, with worldwide ramifications. In addition, potential food and fertiliser export difficulties encountered by the Russian Federation – the major exporter of potash, ammonia, urea and other soil nutrients  – as a result of economic sanctions could jeopardise the food security of many countries.

Rising energy prices are also pushing agricultural costs higher, contributing to increasing food prices globally. The agriculture and food industries use energy for various purposes. Direct energy use includes electricity for automated water irrigation, fuel consumption for farm machinery and energy required at various stages of food processing, packaging, transportation and distribution. The use of pesticides and mineral fertilisers results in large quantities of indirect energy consumption, with these inputs being highly energy intensive to manufacture. While the share varies considerably between regions – depending on factors such as weather conditions and crop types – direct and non-direct energy costs can account for 40% to 50% of total variable costs of cropping in advanced economies such as the United States. Higher energy and fertiliser prices therefore inevitably translate into higher production costs, and ultimately into higher food prices.

In May 2022, the FAO estimated that "at least 20 percent of Ukraine's winter crops" "may not be harvested or planted". The food system-related environmental impacts of the war may include long-term harm to Ukraine's soil.

Export agreements
The United Nations, Russia, Ukraine, and Turkey signed agreements on July 22, 2022, intended to secure exports via the Black Sea of grain from both countries and fertilizer from Russia, to ease shortages in developing countries. The next day, Russia fired missiles at the port city of Odesa, through which Ukrainian grain flows. On September 7, 2022, Putin announced his intent to revise the terms of the grain export agreement.

Management
Scientists cautioned that policy-makers should not abandon sustainable farming practices to increase grain production in response to resulting food insecurity, but change "the demand side which can [also] lead to both a more resilient and more sustainable global food system" – such as limiting the import of animal feed (e.g. as meat-production requires relatively large amounts of needed foods and of agricultural land) – and e.g. expanding wheat production in high-productivity areas. Possible major policy-based actions that could mitigate the energy and resource crises caused or exacerbated by the war could include demand-side focused measures, worded briefly as (facilitating people to) "grow more food and less fodder, drive and fly less, turn down the thermostat".

Energy and oil 

In January 2022, Russia produced 11.3 million barrels per day (Mb/d) of crude oil and condensate, of which 10Mb/d was crude oil. This makes Russia the world’s third largest producer of oil, surpassed only by the United States and Saudi Arabia (in the same period, they produced 17.6 Mb/d and 12 Mb/d, respectively). However, Russia is the largest exporter of oil products to global markets and the second largest exporter of crude, after Saudi Arabia. Russia exported 7.8 Mb/d in December 2021, including 5Mb/d of crude.
Within the initial two weeks of the invasion, prices in global oil markets had surged by US$8 per barrel, pushing prices for Brent oil above $100 a barrel for the first time since 2014. On 27 February, BP, one of the world's seven largest oil and gas companies and the single largest foreign investor in Russia, announced it was divesting its 19.75% stake in Rosneft. The Rosneft interest comprises about half of BP's oil and gas reserves and a third of its production. The divestment may cost the company up to $25 billion and analysts noted that it was unlikely that BP would be able to recover a fraction of this cost. The same day, the Government Pension Fund of Norway, the world's largest sovereign wealth fund, announced that it would freeze investment in Russia and divest its Russian assets. Before the invasion, the fund owned about 25 billion Norwegian krone ($2.83 billion) in Russian company shares and government bonds.

On 28 February, as a result of the invasion, the Government of Canada announced a ban on Russian crude oil imports to Canada; according to the Government of Canada it was not importing crude oil from Russia at the time when the ban was announced.On 2 March the stocks of Gazprom, Rosneft and Lukoil which have secondary listings in London had lost respectively 99.2%, 88.1% and 99.6% of their value year-to-date. In September 2021 Lukoil and Rosneft had a combined market capitalization of $140 billion, by 2 March their combined market cap stood at just $9.3 billion, erasing $130 billion in value. Due to low demand for Russian crude, the benchmark Russian Crude Oil Urals oil was trading at a $18 discount to Brent and still struggling to find purchasers as oil traders feared sanctions.

Prior to the sanctions, about 60 percent of Russia’s oil exports went to European OECD member countries. As of November 2021, Russia accounted for 34 percent of European oil imports. It was estimated by the consultancy Energy Aspects that up to 70% of Russian Crude was "struggling to find buyers" as its normal export market of Europe sought crude instead from the Middle East. While sanctions and the toxicity of being seen to do business in Russia were major risk factors, another was the difficulty of the wartime situation in the Black Sea. This led to major shipping companies requiring war insurance for tankers picking up from Novorossiysk, Russia's primary oil export terminal. The difficulties of insurance also affected Kazakh crude which uses Novorossiysk for its Tengiz field.

As of November 2021, Russian oil accounted for 17 percent of total imports in OECD Americas (625 kb/d). On 8 March US President Joe Biden announced a ban on oil from Russia, telling reporters, "We're banning all imports of Russian oil and gas energy. That means Russian oil will no longer be acceptable in US ports and the American people will deal another powerful blow to Putin's war machine." Germany's Minister for Economic Affairs Robert Habeck cautioned, "If we do not obtain more gas next winter and if deliveries from Russia were to be cut then we would not have enough gas to heat all our houses and keep all our industry going."

In the first three months since the start of the invasion of Ukraine, Russia earned $24 billion from selling energy to China and India. About 20 percent of Russia’s oil exports went to China, Russia’s largest single buyer as of November 2021. That year, China purchased an average of 1.6 million barrels of Russian crude oil per day. Five percent of the total oil imports of the OECD Asia Oceania region came from Russia (440 kb/d). In June 2022 Russia became China's largest supplier of oil with Russia supplying over half of China's oil imports. Russia has also historically been a significant exporter of crude to former Soviet and Eastern bloc countries, including Ukraine, Belarus, Romania and Bulgaria.

As many Western nations imposed sanctions on Russian energy firms, Saudi Arabia's Kingdom Holding secretly invested more than $500 million in three major Russian energy companies between February and March 2022. In February, the investment firm invested in global depository receipts of Gazprom and Rosneft worth $365 million and $52 million respectively. Then, between February and March, the firm invested $109 million in Lukoil's US depository receipts. Kingdom Holding is controlled by billionaire Prince Alwaleed Bin Talal and is 16.9% owned by Saudi Arabia's sovereign wealth fund chaired by crown prince Mohammed Bin Salman.

Electricity

The 2014 annexation of Crimea started the process of Ukrenergo disconnecting the national power grid from the Russian-controlled IPS/UPS grid (a legacy of the Soviet Union) and joining the European Network of Transmission System Operators for Electricity (ENTSO-E). The military build up and invasion in 2022 put the process on an emergency timetable. Ukraine and Moldova disconnected from the Russian grid on 28 February, and connected to the synchronous grid of Continental Europe on 16 March.

Russian attacks destroyed some power generation stations and distribution substations, and advances resulted in the capture of others. The Zaporizhzhia Nuclear Power Plant (along with the Zaporizhzhia thermal power station) was captured on March 4, and Russia claimed it was being operated by Rosatom.

About a million people lost power due to fighting around Mariupol, Kyiv, and Chernobyl.

International organizations and corporations 
Kristalina Georgieva, the managing director of the International Monetary Fund (IMF) warned that the conflict poses a substantial economic risk for the region and internationally, and added that the IMF could help other countries impacted by the conflict, complementary to a $2.2 billion loan package being prepared to assist Ukraine. David Malpass, the president of the World Bank Group, said that the conflict would have far-reaching economic and social effects and reported that the bank was preparing options for significant economic and fiscal support to Ukrainians and the region.

Corporate boycotts and removals of service 

Many international retail and wholesale companies announced a suspension or end to their operations in Russia and in many cases also Belarus. Companies boycotting Russia and Belarus include:
 Shipping: UPS, FedEx, La Poste S.A., and DHL announced that they would halt shipments to Russia and Ukraine. Maersk,  MSC and CMA CGM announced that any new container shipping to and from Russia would be suspended.
 Entertainment: Disney, Netflix, Paramount and Universal, Sony Pictures Entertainment, Warner Media/Warner Bros. TikTok restricted access to Russian users and access to Russian content.
 Food and beverage: Yum Brands (KFC, Pizza Hut) McDonald's, Starbucks, Coca-Cola, PepsiCo (except milk and other dairy offerings, baby formula and baby food), Heineken N.V. (except for its Russian brands), Carlsberg (except for its Russian brands), Nestlé, and others.
 Technology: Apple, Adobe, Cisco, Dell, Oracle, Microsoft, Panasonic, Samsung, and many more.
 Automotive: Car manufacturers Ford, General Motors, Jaguar and Volvo suspended all sales and operations in Russia. Honda suspended all exports to Russia and Toyota announced it halted production at its plant in Saint Petersburg and ceased all shipments to Russia. Mazda suspended shipments of parts to Russia. Volkswagen suspended production in and stopped exports to Russia. Nissan also halted manufacturing in Russia and vehicle exports. Stellantis, the maker of Jeep, Fiat, Citroen, Peugeot and Opel vehicles, has suspended exports of cars from Russia and imports of vehicles into the country. Hyundai announced suspension of production in Russia.

Stock markets, banking sector, and the impact on the rouble 

In Russia, the first round of economic sanctions in response to Russia's 2022 invasion of Ukraine had an immediate effect. The Russian stock market crashed, falling 39%, as measured by the RTS Index, on 24 February, the first day of the invasion, recovering over 26% in the following day; however, on 28 February, a Monday, the Moscow stock exchange closed for the day because of the "developing situation". The Moscow stock exchange remained closed on Tuesday and Wednesday as well, marking the longest stock market closure since October 1998. It further remained closed until 21 March 2022, marking almost a full month of closure.

The rouble fell to record lows as Russians rushed to exchange money. The Moscow and St Petersburg Stock Exchanges were suspended. The Central Bank of Russia announced its first market interventions since the 2014 annexation of Crimea to stabilize the market. It also raised interest rates to 20% and banned foreigners from selling local securities. The sanctions put Russia's sovereign wealth fund at risk of disappearing. Long lines and empty ATMs have been reported in Russian cities.

A second round of sanctions involved various Russian banks being removed from SWIFT, and direct sanctions on the Russian Central Bank. The value of the rouble fell 30% against the U.S. dollar, to as low as ₽119/$1 as of 28 February. The Russian central bank raised interest rates to 20% as a result. In an attempt to balance the sinking rouble, it temporarily shut down the Moscow Stock Exchange, mandated that all Russian companies sell 80% of foreign exchange reserves, and prohibited foreigners from liquidating assets in Russia. On 7 March, the ruble was reported to be as low as ₽142.46/$1.

Also on 28 February, Mastercard Inc. blocked multiple Russian financial institutions from its payment network. On 1 March, VISA Inc. announced that it had blocked those on the sanction list and that they were "prepared to comply with additional sanctions that may be implemented". Binance, the world's largest cryptocurrency exchange, announced that it would block Russian individuals who have been sanctioned but would not unilaterally freeze all Russian users accounts. Coinbase, a cryptocurrency exchange platform, blocked 25,000 cryptocurrency wallet addresses related to Russia, believing them to have engaged in illicit activity. However, Coinbase also said that it would "not institute a blanket ban on all Coinbase transactions involving Russian addresses".

On 2 March, Russian listed securities trading on the London market fell sharply before the London Stock Exchange suspended trade of 27 Russian securities. "The FTSE Russell index business has removed Russian listings from its indices, the London Stock Exchange has suspended trading in 27 Russian listed securities" stated London Stock Exchange CEO David Schwimmer. Of the most severe losses, Sberbank was down 99.72% year-to-date to trade for around a single penny, Lukoil was down 99.2%, Polyus was down 95.58%, Gazprom was down 93.71%, and Rosneft was down 92.52%.

During the month of March, the rouble gradually recovered back to its pre-war value of ~80 Rubles per dollar, partially due to increased gas and oil demand from Western companies, as they feared a potential ban on Russian resources, as well as various economic measures designed to prop up the currency.

Other commodities

Nickel prices doubled after the invasion, due to fears that sanctions on Russia could cut off exports from Nornickel, the world's largest supplier.

Foreign investment 
The Russian invasion of Ukraine continually exacerbated the consumerism market within the country, in which several foreign companies began to suspend their function in Russia. According to one study from Yale University, merely 350 foreign investment companies have successfully fled the region, including luxury and retail sectors such as Chanel and Zara. McDonalds is one of the significant companies that ceased their 850 locations and united with Starbucks, Ikea and Heineken to thwart their operation during the midst of Western sanctions. Nevertheless, suspending processes from the sector believe to be a temporary move, and the company remains to disburse their workers. Thus, instituting a proliferation of concern among Russian civilians considering the restaurant was one of the first fast-food chains to operate in the former Soviet Union and drastically merge to Russian everyday activity. One interviewee expressed her concern regarding the closure of diverse sectors: "When we stood in line all those years ago, we understood the country had a real future."

Moreover, it discovered that 150 companies, including BP, Exxon, and Shell, had halted their engagement in the Russian market. Asset-light companies perhaps encounter less complicated occurrences to withdraw their operation than other sectors with a sizeable reserve of workers.

Disney continually participated in the protest against the Russian aggression on Ukraine by pausing its theatrical release; moreover, it was the first entertainment to boycott the country. Warner Bros likewise announced it would pause its releases of films in the country, including The Batman.

Adidas also suspended its contract with the Russian football league after FIFA decided to suspend Russia from international football competitions, including the  men's 2022 world cup.

Luxury fashion giant LVMH, an enterprise that possesses ownership in several high-end fashion brands, including Louis Vuitton, Christian Dior, Fendi, and Givenchy, announced it would temporarily shut down its location in Russia

Export restrictions 

The Biden administration announced the latest round of export restrictions on Russia and Belarus, adding 120 Russian and Belarusian entities to the list of sanctioned entities, most of which have connections to the military. These restrictions are designed to weaken Russian and Belarusian defence, aviation, naval, and other strategic sectors in response to Russia's invasion of Ukraine. Secretary of Commerce Gina Raimondo said in a statement, "these parties are being effectively cut off from the inputs necessary to sustain Putin's war".

Structural macroeconomic and geopolitical changes

Economic recession 
The World Bank predicted that the Ukrainian economy will contract by 45 percent in 2022 and the Russian economy by 11.2 percent due to the Russian invasion of Ukraine.

Other
A study suggests that structural humanitarian, economic, and financial impacts of the war will include a) the EU getting "more serious about defence" b) that the green transition accelerates c) unwinding of broader Eurasian economic integration d) EU accession prospects for countries in Southeast Europe may improve.

Further macroeconomic changes include major calls for novel excess profit taxes such as on energy companies or on war-caused excess profits. Proponents include UN Secretary-General António Guterres.

War profiteering

The major oil and gas companies, including Shell, Exxon Mobil, Chevron, Phillips 66, BP and Sinopec, and the major weapon manufacturers, such as Raytheon, Lockheed Martin and BAE Systems, reported sharp rises in interim revenues and profits.

The term "ABCD" refers to the four companies – ADM, Bunge, Cargill and Louis Dreyfus – that dominate world agricultural commodity trading. The ABCD commodity-trading companies have seen large profits as a result of the war in Ukraine and rising food prices.

In March 2022, Bloomberg reported that China was reselling its US LNG shipments to a desperate Europe at a "hefty profit". India was buying discounted oil from Russia. Saudi Arabia also increased imports of discounted Russian oil. In September 2022, German Economy Minister Robert Habeck accused the United States and other "friendly" gas supplier nations that they were profiting from the Ukraine war with "astronomical prices". He called for more solidarity by the US to assist energy-pressed allies in Europe. French President Emmanuel Macron accused the United States, Norway and other "friendly" natural gas supplier states of extremely high prices for their supplies, saying that Europeans are "paying four times more than the price you sell to your industry. That is not exactly the meaning of friendship."

Impact on population 

Due to the deteriorating economic situation in Russia, coupled with civil and political unrest, people have fled the country. A journalist who fled to Georgia wrote on his Facebook page, "Do you think we are all tourists...We are refugees...We ran not from bullets, bombs and missiles, but from prison." With large sections of airspace closed to Russian aircraft, flights from Russia to Tel Aviv, Israel; Istanbul, Turkey; Yerevan, Armenia; Baku, Azerbaijan; and Tbilisi, Georgia were sold out for many days, as well as buses into Baltic states. One Latvia-based Russian tech worker, seeing high demand to leave the country, chartered a flight and filled the approximately 160 seats within 24 hours. The wave of emigration has caused many officials and analysts to warn of a possible significant long-term drag on the economy, especially if the emigration is permanent.

Those staying in Russia face surging inflation and unemployment, expensive credit, capital controls, restricted travel, and shortages of goods. Analysts have identified similarities with conditions in the decade following the collapse of the Soviet Union at the end of the Cold War. Russia's Kaliningrad exclave faces ever-increasing isolation. Additionally several leading foreign tech companies withdrew from Russia or suspended operations while Russian authorities also doubled down on the use of their "sovereign internet" technology to block access to numerous independent media and social media platforms. Altogether, it enabled Russia to put the entire country in digital isolation, as in China, because of the Golden Shield Project.

Due to the fact that Russia is the largest trading and economic partner for post-Soviet states in Central Asia and a major destination for millions of CIS's migrant workers, Central Asia has been particularly hard hit by sanctions against Russia.

Destroyed infrastructure 
The conflict between Russia and Ukraine has led to the destruction of the local Ukrainian urban landscape. Starting on September 2022, Russia focused on destroying Ukraine's energy grid, by launching multiple attacks on power stations and electricity distribution.

Opposition to sanctions

China expressed opposition to sanctions against Russia. Nations and individuals that oppose sanctions against Russia state that sanctions do not generally result in a change in the policies of the sanctioned nation and that sanctions mostly hurt the civilian population who have little control over the issues pertaining to foreign policy. India is also buying discounted oil from Russia. Trade with India would enable Russia to bypass some of the sanctions, which has led the US to tell India there might be "consequences". Saudi Arabia also increased imports of discounted Russian oil. Not a single country in Africa or the Middle East has imposed major sanctions on Russia.

Russian seizure of goods by nations imposing sanctions 
In early March 2022, former Russian President Dmitry Medvedev announced a new law which would allow Russia to nationalize assets of Western companies pulling out of the country. Concerns have been raised by analysts that potential auctions of assets of companies that have left Russia would potentially mirror the 1990s "loans for shares" programme introduced by Boris Yeltsin. This could potentially create more wealth for already favoured individuals, new oligarchs, or business opportunities for Russian supporters.

On 28 March 2022, Russia reportedly seized multiple Audemars Piguet Swiss watches from one of its Russian stores that had been closed after the invasion. The seized items were valued to total multiple millions of dollars as each watch can cost upwards of $921,000 a piece, and were reportedly taken by Russian FSB agents who claimed the watches had violated local customs rules when they had been imported. Additionally hundreds of leased foreign passenger jets, valued at about $10 billion have remained grounded in the country with requests for the jets to be returned denied.

See also
 International sanctions during the 2022 Russian invasion of Ukraine
 Restriction of transit with the Kaliningrad Oblast
 Russian emigration following the 2022 invasion of Ukraine
 2022 Ukrainian refugee crisis
 2022 Russia–EU gas dispute

References

Economic history of Russia
Russian financial crisis, 2022
Stock market crashes
Debt
Political history of Russia
Russian Financial Crisis, 2022
financial crisis
Economic